Chia Wei Jie (born 3 January 2000) is a Malaysian badminton player. He was part of the Malaysian team that won a silver medal at the 2017 BWF World Junior Championships.

Career 
He won two consecutive bronze medals at the Badminton Asia Junior Championships, both in 2017 and 2018 respectively. He has had many partner exchanges. He partnered with Pearly Tan for a brief period of time and they were runners-up at the India International.

He then partnered with Chang Yee Jun and earned a runners-up position at the 2021 Polish Open.

In 2022, he partnered with Low Hang Yee and got through the finals of the Swedish Open and the Ukraine Open. Because of his results with his partner, he was selected as a backup player for the Malaysian squad at the 2022 Thomas & Uber Cup.

Achievements

Asian Junior Championships 
Boys' doubles

BWF International Challenge/Series (1 title, 3 runners-up) 
Men's doubles

Mixed doubles

  BWF International Challenge tournament
  BWF International Series tournament
  BWF Future Series tournament

References

External links 
 

2000 births
Living people
Malaysian sportspeople of Chinese descent
Malaysian male badminton players